"Lucille" is a song written by Roger Bowling and Hal Bynum, and recorded by American country music artist Kenny Rogers.  It was released in January 1977 as the second and final single from the album Kenny Rogers.  It became Rogers' first major hit as a solo artist after leaving the successful country/rock group The First Edition the previous year.  An international hit, it reached number 1 on the Billboard Country Singles chart and number 5 on the Billboard Hot 100. Overseas, "Lucille" reached the top of the UK Singles Chart in June 1977, the first of Rogers' two number 1 singles there.

Content
The song, told by the narrator (Rogers), tells the story of a man in a bar in Toledo, Ohio, who acquaints himself with a downhearted married woman named Lucille.  An inebriated Lucille admits her unhappiness in life and her longing for adventure.  Her husband arrives and approaches the two; the narrator is intimidated by the man.  The brokenhearted husband, starting to shake, scorns her for her inconvenient timing in abandoning him "with 4 hungry children and a crop in the field", leaving him with a " hurtin' " that won't heal.  After the husband leaves, Lucille and the narrator make their way to a hotel room. Once there, however, the narrator is unable to engage romantically, in spite of her willingness and her beauty. He keeps recalling the husband's haunting words.

Chart performance

Weekly charts

Year-end charts

References

UK Singles Chart number-one singles
1977 singles
1977 songs
Kenny Rogers songs
Waylon Jennings songs
Billy Currington songs
Songs written by Roger Bowling (songwriter)
Songs written by Hal Bynum
Song recordings produced by Larry Butler (producer)
RPM Top Singles number-one singles
United Artists Records singles
Number-one singles in South Africa